Scandal on the Champs-Élysées (French: Scandale aux Champs-Élysées) is a 1949 French crime drama film directed by Roger Blanc and starring Pierre Renoir, Françoise Christophe and Guy Decomble.

It was shot at the Billancourt Studios in Paris. The film's sets were designed by the art director Lucien Aguettand.

Synopsis
After the murder of two models working in the famous fashion house of Dominique Airelle, Inspector Pascaud is called in to investigate. His suspicions fall on a number of candidates.

Cast
 Pierre Renoir as Dominique Airelle
 Françoise Christophe as Françoise 
 Guy Decomble as Pascaud
 Jean Parédès as Étienne
 André Gabriello as Vincent 
 Jacques Fath as Thierry
 Christiane Barry as 	Jacqueline
 Agnès Laury as Monique
 René Alié as Le Sud-Américain
 Jacqueline Carlier as Yvonne
 Annette Delattre as Lise
 José Casa as Le commissaire				
 Roger Rafal as Le juge d'instruction
 Colette Régis as Suzanne
 Marion Tourès as Jenny
 Anouk Ferjac as Colette

References

Bibliography 
 Rège, Philippe. Encyclopedia of French Film Directors, Volume 1. Scarecrow Press, 2009.

External links 
 

1949 films
French crime drama films
1949 crime films
1940s French-language films
French black-and-white films
Films directed by Roger Blanc
Films set in Paris
Films shot at Billancourt Studios
1940s French films